Allium weschniakowii is an Asian species of wild onion native to Xinjiang, Kazakhstan and Kyrgyzstan.

Allium weschniakowii has a cluster of narrow bulbs rarely more than 5 mm in diameter. Scape is rather short of the genus, only up to 16 cm tall. Leaves are tubular, shorter than the scape. Umbel has only a few red to violet flowers.

References

External links
Line drawings of Allium weschniakowii + A. atrosanguineum, Flora of China Illustrations vol. 24, fig. 175.

weschniakowii
Onions
Flora of temperate Asia
Plants described in 1880